The Saskatchewan Open was a golf tournament on PGA Tour Canada that was held in Saskatchewan, Canada.

Founded in 1919, the Saskatchewan Open was held annually until 1981, only missing from the calendar in 1924 when the Western Canada tournament was held in Saskatchewan and for four years during the Second World War. Following the withdrawal of major sponsors, Molson Brewery, it was not held in 1982. Still lacking sponsors, it returned in 1983 and 1984 but as a relatively minor event before entering an extended hiatus. Having not been played from 1985 to 2007, it was revived in 2008. From 2010 the tournament had several changes of title, all reflecting its host venue and sponsor, the Dakota Dunes Casino. It was last held in 2016.

Winners

References

External links
Coverage on PGA Tour Canada's official site
List of winners, 1919–2008

Former PGA Tour Canada events
Golf tournaments in Saskatchewan
Recurring sporting events established in 1919
Recurring sporting events disestablished in 2016
1919 establishments in Saskatchewan
2016 disestablishments in Saskatchewan